Humour is something that may amuse.

Humor or Humour also may refer to:
 Humors, the blood, phlegm, and biles in old theory of humorism
 Mănăstirea Humorului, a commune in Suceava County, Romania, sometimes known as Humor
 Humor Monastery in Mănăstirea Humorului commune, Romania
 Humor, a tributary of the Bistrița in Suceava County, Romania
 Humor (Moldova), a tributary of the Moldova in Suceava County, Romania
 Humor: International Journal of Humor Research

See also 
 Anatomic fluids adjacent to lens of vertebrate eye:
 Aqueous humour, watery and behind cornea
 Vitreous humour, gel-like and in front of retina